Siousca is an unincorporated community in Chester County, Pennsylvania, United States. Siousca is located at the intersection of Pennsylvania Route 82 and Pennsylvania Route 340 at the tripoint of the city of Coatesville and Valley and West Brandywine townships.

References

Unincorporated communities in Chester County, Pennsylvania
Unincorporated communities in Pennsylvania